Kang Ho-gyeong was the first and oldest ancestor of Taejo who established Goryeo dynasty. His name can be found in Korean historical literature such as Goryeosa and Pyeonnyeon-Tong-Rok (:ko:편년통록). He is the founder of the Sinchon Kang Clan. While he is known to be the clan's founder, some regard the clan's semi-founder to be Kang Ji-yeon, the descendant of Kang Ho-gyeong, to be more of the clan's official progenitor.

Family
Wife: Unnamed lady (좌곡 여인)
Son: Gang Chung (강충, 康忠)
Daughter-in-law: Lady Gu (부인 구씨, 夫人 具氏)
Grandson: Yi Je-geon (이제건, 伊帝建)
Grandson: Gang Bo-yuk (강보육, 康寶育)
Grandson: Gang Bo-jeon (강보전, 康寶甸)

References 

Korean generals
Goguryeo people
Sincheon Kang clan